Jeremy Stuart Smith is an Australian rock musician; he was a founding member of Hunters & Collectors on French horn, guitars, keyboards, programming, and backing vocals (1981–1998). Smith worked on Ghostwriters's 1996 album, Second Skin.

Biography
Jeremy Smith is a Melbourne-based musician; he was a member of Hunters & Collectors on French horn, guitars, keyboards, programming, and backing vocals (1981–1998) and worked on Ghostwriters's 1996 album, Second Skin.

He provided percussion elements for some Midnight Oil tracks and recorded horns on their album, Redneck Wonderland. Smith also played on their album Scream In Blue. He also composed the theme music for Wolf Blass, an Australian winery.

References

General
  Note: Archived [on-line] copy has limited functionality.
  Note: [on-line] version established at White Room Electronic Publishing Pty Ltd in 2007 and was expanded from the 2002 edition.

Specific

Australian rock guitarists
Year of birth missing (living people)
Living people
Musicians from Melbourne
Hunters & Collectors members